The Sino-Dutch War 1661, also known as Hero Zheng Chenggong, is a 2000 Chinese historical drama film directed by Wu Ziniu, starring Vincent Zhao, Jiang Qinqin, Du Zhiguo, Yoko Shimada, Xu Min and Zhang Shan. The film is loosely based on the life of Koxinga (Zheng Chenggong) and focuses on his battle with the Dutch East India Company for control of Taiwan at the Siege of Fort Zeelandia. The film was released in 2002 in Japan under the title Kokusenya Kassen.

Plot
In the mid-17th century, most of China has been conquered by the Manchu-led Qing dynasty after the collapse of the Ming dynasty. Ming remnants have fled south and established a Southern Ming regime based in Fujian Province, with the Longwu Emperor as their figurehead monarch. The Qing armies are closing in on Fujian and the southern areas under Ming control.

Zheng Sen is the son of Zheng Zhilong, a former pirate who became a Ming general. Having heard of Zheng Sen's strong sense of loyalty, the Longwu Emperor is so impressed with him that he grants him the imperial family name, Zhu, and a new personal name, Chenggong (literally "success"). Zheng Sen is known as the Imperial Name-keeper (transliterated "Koxinga") or Zheng Chenggong from then on. Around the time, Taiwan has been colonised by the Dutch East India Company for over three decades and many people have signed a petition requesting Zheng Chenggong to help them claim back Taiwan from the Dutch.

Zheng Zhilong defects to the Qing dynasty after seeing that he has no future in Southern Ming. Despite his father's betrayal, Zheng Chenggong remains loyal to the Longwu Emperor and continues to resist the Qing invaders even after the fall of Southern Ming. He plans to retreat to Taiwan and establish a new base of operations there in preparation for retaking Mainland China from the Qing dynasty. In 1661, Zheng Chenggong's fleet sets sail from Xiamen to attack the Dutch on Taiwan. Nine months later, he defeats the Dutch at the Siege of Fort Zeelandia and forces them to surrender and relinquish their control of Taiwan to him.

Cast
 Vincent Zhao as Zheng Chenggong
 Jiang Qinqin as Xue Liang
 Du Zhiguo as Zheng Zhilong
 Yoko Shimada as Tagawa Matsu
 Xu Min as the Longwu Emperor
 Zhang Shan as Li Wei
 Alexander de Zwager as the Dutch governor
 Jiang Guoyin
 Wang Ling
 Xu Yuanqi

Casting
Director Wu Ziniu originally had Tony Leung in mind for the role of Zheng Chenggong before Vincent Zhao took over.

See also
 List of works about the Dutch East India Company
 Lord of Formosa

References

External links
 
 

2000 films
2000s Mandarin-language films
2000s war films
Chinese historical films
Chinese war films
Films directed by Wu Ziniu
Works about the Dutch East India Company
Films set in the 1660s
Koxinga
2000s historical films
Films shot in Fujian
2000s Chinese films